
This is a list of municipalities in Switzerland having standing links to local communities in other countries. In most cases, the association, especially when formalised by local government, is known as "town twinning" (though other terms, such as "partner towns" or "sister cities" are sometimes used instead), and while most of the places included are towns, the list also comprises villages, cities, districts, counties, etc. with similar links.

A
Aarau

 Neuchâtel, Switzerland
 Reutlingen, Germany

Acquarossa
 Presidente Franco, Paraguay

Affoltern im Emmental
 Hartmanice, Czech Republic

Aigle

 L'Aigle, France
 Bassersdorf, Switzerland
 Tübingen, Germany

Allschwil

 Blaj, Romania
 Pfullendorf, Germany

Arconciel
 Arconcey, France

Arni
 Pacov, Czech Republic

Assens
 Colombey-les-Deux-Églises, France

Ayent
 Saint-Brevin-les-Pins, France

B
Balgach
 Hard, Austria

Balsthal
 Supraśl, Poland

Basel

 Miami Beach, United States
 Shanghai, China

Bätterkinden
 Mirovice, Czech Republic

Baulmes
 Mont-Saint-Sulpice, France

Beatenberg
 Husinec, Czech Republic

Belp
 Telč, Czech Republic

Beringen

 Behringen (Bispingen), Germany
 Behringen (Hörselberg-Hainich), Germany
 Behringen (Stadtilm), Germany
 Beringe (Peel en Maas), Netherlands
 Beringen, Belgium
 Beringen (Mersch), Luxembourg

Bern does not practice twinning with other cities.

Bex
 Tuttlingen, Germany

Biel/Bienne

 Iserlohn, Germany
 San Marcos, Nicaragua

Biglen
 Černovice, Czech Republic

Bischofszell

 Battaglia Terme, Italy
 Tuttlingen, Germany
 Waidhofen an der Ybbs, Austria

Bolligen

 Diemtigen, Switzerland
 Hluboká nad Vltavou, Czech Republic

Bonstetten
 Bonstetten, Germany

Bottens
 Guéreins, France

Boussens
 Boussens, France

Breitenbach

 Artegna, Italy
 Großbreitenbach, Germany

Brenzikofen
 Vyskytná, Czech Republic

Brienz

 Albula/Alvra, Switzerland
 Shimada, Japan
 Tryavna, Bulgaria

Brig-Glis

 Domodossola, Italy
 Langenthal, Switzerland
 San Jerónimo Norte, Argentina

Brugg
 Rottweil, Germany

Brusino Arsizio
 San José de Metán, Argentina

Bülach
 Santeramo in Colle, Italy

C
Carouge
 Budavár (Budapest), Hungary

Céligny
 Bassi, Burkina Faso

Cham
 Cham, Germany

Champéry

 Esperanza, Argentina
 Llandudno, Wales, United Kingdom

Chardonne
 Barbezieux-Saint-Hilaire, France

La Chaux (Cossonay)
 Saou, France

La Chaux-de-Fonds

 Frameries, Belgium
 Winterthur, Switzerland

Cheseaux-sur-Lausanne
 Aubignan, France

Cheyres-Châbles
 Saint-Martial, France

Chur

 Bad Homburg vor der Höhe, Germany
 Cabourg, France
 Mayrhofen, Austria
 Mondorf-les-Bains, Luxembourg
 Terracina, Italy

Corminboeuf
 Fussy, France

Crans-Montana
 Mandelieu-la-Napoule, France

D
Davos

 Aspen, United States
 Chamonix-Mont-Blanc, France
 Ueda, Japan

Delémont

 Belfort, France
 La Trinidad, Nicaragua

Diemtigen

 Bolligen, Switzerland
 Obersiggenthal, Switzerland
 Veselí nad Lužnicí, Czech Republic

Dietikon
 Kolín, Czech Republic

Dulliken
 Ammerndorf, Germany

Dürnten
 Szentbékkálla, Hungary

E
Echichens
 Saint-Fiacre-sur-Maine, France

Eggiwil
 Nová Včelnice, Czech Republic

Eiken

 Eecke, France
 Eke (Nazareth), Belgium
 Melle, Germany

Evolène
 Châtelaillon-Plage, France

F
Forst-Längenbühl
 Dírná, Czech Republic

Frauenfeld
 Kufstein, Germany

Fribourg
 Rueil-Malmaison, France

Froideville
 La Pacaudière, France

Füllinsdorf
 Burgkirchen, Austria

G
Geneva does not practice twinning with other cities to keep its neutrality.

Glarus
 Biebrich, Germany

Le Grand-Saconnex
 Carantec, France

Grenchen

 Neckarsulm, Germany
 Sélestat, France

Grindelwald
 Matsumoto, Japan

Grosshöchstetten
 Žirovnice, Czech Republic

Gruyères
 Renaison, France

H
Hausen am Albis
 Letohrad, Czech Republic

Heimberg
 Horažďovice, Czech Republic

Hérémence
 Esperanza, Argentina

Herzogenbuchsee
 Senica, Slovakia

Hilterfingen
 Hersbruck, Germany

Hinwil
 Jablonné nad Orlicí, Czech Republic

Hünenberg

 Banská Štiavnica, Slovakia
 Marly, Switzerland

I
Illnau-Effretikon

 Calanca, Switzerland
 Großbottwar, Germany
 Mont-sur-Rolle, Switzerland
 Orlová, Czech Republic

Interlaken

 Huangshan, China
 Ōtsu, Japan
 Scottsdale, United States
 Třeboň, Czech Republic
 Zeuthen, Germany

Ittigen
 Dobrush, Belarus

J
Jorat-Mézières
 Carrouges, France

K
Kaisten
 Kaisten (Wasserlosen), Germany

Kallnach

 Dolní Bukovsko, Czech Republic
 Nišovice, Czech Republic

Kiesen
 Želiv, Czech Republic

Kirchdorf
 Červená Řečice, Czech Republic

Klingnau
 Sankt Blasien, Germany

Köniz
 Prijepolje, Serbia

Konolfingen
 Počátky, Czech Republic

Krauchthal
 Kamenný Újezd, Czech Republic

Kreuzlingen

 Cisternino, Italy
 Wolfach, Germany

Kriens
 San Damiano d'Asti, Italy

Küsnacht
 Červený Kostelec, Czech Republic

Küssnacht

 Küssaberg, Germany
 Zduny, Poland

L
Lachen
 Schramberg, Germany

Langenthal

 Brig-Glis, Switzerland
 Neviano, Italy

Laufen
 Laufen, Germany

Lausanne

 Akhisar, Turkey
 Bangkok, Thailand
 Osijek, Croatia
 Pernik, Bulgaria

Lengnau, Bern

 Lengnau, Aargau, Switzerland
 Monteroni di Lecce, Italy
 Strakonice, Czech Republic

Liestal

 Onex, Switzerland
 Sacramento, United States
 Waldkirch, Germany

Locarno

 Gagra, Georgia
 Karlovy Vary, Czech Republic
 Lompoc, United States
 Montecatini Terme, Italy
 Urbino, Italy

Le Locle
 Gérardmer, France

Lostorf
 Rielasingen-Worblingen, Germany

Lotzwil
 Větřní, Czech Republic

Lucerne

 Bournemouth, England, United Kingdom
 Chicago, United States
 Guebwiller, France
 Murbach, France
 Olomouc, Czech Republic
 Potsdam, Germany

Lützelflüh
 Velike Lašče, Slovenia

Lyss
 Monopoli, Italy

M
Martigny

 Sursee, Switzerland
 Vaison-la-Romaine, France

Meisterschwanden
 Saint-Claude-de-Diray, France

Metzerlen-Mariastein
 Mariastein, Austria

Misery-Courtion
 Voiteur, France

Möhlin
 Zlín, Czech Republic

Monthey

 Diekirch, Luxembourg
 Göd, Hungary
 Ivrea, Italy
 Tübingen, Germany

Montreux

 Menton, France
 Wiesbaden, Germany

Moosseedorf
 Kaçanik, Kosovo

Morcote
 Viarmes, France

Morges

 Rochefort, Belgium
 Vertou, France

Moudon
 Mazan, France

Mühleberg
 Schwanfeld, Germany

Münchenbuchsee

 Landiswil, Switzerland
 Milevsko, Czech Republic

N
Neuchâtel

 Aarau, Switzerland
 Besançon, France
 Sansepolcro, Italy

Nottwil
 Schwaigern, Germany

Nyon
 Nyons, France

O
Oberdiessbach

 Féchy, Switzerland
 Kardašova Řečice, Czech Republic

Oberembrach
 Trhová Kamenice, Czech Republic

Oberthal
 Chýnov, Czech Republic

Oberwil
 Aschau im Zillertal, Austria

Oberwil im Simmental

 Čejetice, Czech Republic
 Guggisberg, Switzerland
 Ostermundigen, Switzerland

Olten
 Altenburg, Germany

Onex

 Bandol, France
 Liestal, Switzerland
 Massagno, Switzerland

Oron

 Bussac, France
 Vers-Pont-du-Gard, France

Orpund
 Brtnice, Czech Republic

Ostermundigen

 Löhnberg, Germany
 Oberwil im Simmental, Switzerland

P
Payerne
 Paray-le-Monial, France

Perroy

 Châteauneuf-de-Gadagne, France
 Zofingen, Switzerland

Plaffeien
 Kasterlee, Belgium

Plan-les-Ouates

 Birsfelden, Switzerland
 Sângeorgiu de Pădure, Romania
 Villefranche-sur-Mer, France

Pontresina
 Gaylord, United States

Port
 Holýšov, Czech Republic

Préverenges
 Préveranges, France

Pully
 Obernai, France

R
Rafz
 Hetvehely, Hungary

Rapperswil-Jona

 Aalborg, Denmark
 Bagno di Romagna, Italy

Reigoldswil

 Bad Bellingen, Germany
 Petit-Landau, France

Riddes
 Esperanza, Argentina

Riehen
 Miercurea Ciuc, Romania

Riggisberg
 Myštice, Czech Republic

Risch
 Amaroni, Italy

Roggwil
 Blatná, Czech Republic

Rorschach
 Sopron, Hungary

Rubigen
 Plánice, Czech Republic

Rüthi
 Wolfegg, Germany

S
Saas-Fee

 Rocca di Cambio, Italy
 Steamboat Springs, United States

Saillon
 Barbentane, France

Saint-Martin
 Esperanza, Argentina

Saxon
 Bouliac, France

Schaffhausen

 Dobrich, Bulgaria
 Joinville, Brazil
 Sindelfingen, Germany

 Varaždin, Croatia

Schenkon
 Schenkenzell, Germany

Schöfflisdorf
 Missolonghi, Greece

Schüpfen
 Lišov, Czech Republic

Schwerzenbach
 Aizpute, Latvia

Seftigen
 Kovářov, Czech Republic

Sevelen
 Issum, Germany

Sierre

 Aubenas, France
 Cesenatico, Italy
 Schwarzenbek, Germany
 Zelzate, Belgium

Sigriswil

 Lutry, Switzerland
 Villa General Belgrano, Argentina

Sion
 Colón, Argentina

Sirnach
 Helvécia, Hungary

Siselen
 Albrechtice nad Vltavou, Czech Republic

Solothurn

 Heilbronn, Germany
 Kraków, Poland
 Le Landeron, Switzerland

Soral
 Labeaume, France

Spreitenbach
 Bra, Italy

St. Moritz

 Bariloche, Argentina
 Kutchan, Japan
 Vail, United States

Subingen

 Nueva Helvecia, Uruguay
 Rosario, Uruguay

Suhr
 Castelnuovo Rangone, Italy

Sursee

 Highland, United States
 Martigny, Switzerland

T
Thierachern
 Sezimovo Ústí, Czech Republic

Thun
 Gabrovo, Bulgaria

La Tour-de-Peilz
 Ornans, France

Trient
 Esperanza, Argentina

Trimmis
 Weyregg am Attersee, Austria

Trub
 Novosedly nad Nežárkou, Czech Republic

Trubschachen

 Midway, United States
 Strmilov, Czech Republic

Tübach
 Oberteuringen, Germany

Tuggen
 Zell am Harmersbach, Germany

U
Uetendorf
 Sušice, Czech Republic

Urtenen-Schönbühl

 Binn, Switzerland
 Dačice, Czech Republic

Uster
 Prenzlau, Germany

V
Valbirse
 Tar, Hungary

Vétroz
 Beaumont-lès-Valence, France

Vevey

 Carpentras, France
 Müllheim, Germany

Vex
 Esperanza, Argentina

Vucherens
 Droiturier, France

W
Wetzikon

 Badolato, Italy
 Mělník, Czech Republic

Wil
 Dobrzeń Wielki, Poland

Winterthur

 La Chaux-de-Fonds, Switzerland
 Hall in Tirol, Austria
 Plzeň, Czech Republic
 Yverdon-les-Bains, Switzerland

Wohlen
 Lermoos, Austria

Wünnewil-Flamatt
 Tápiógyörgye, Hungary

Y
Yverdon-les-Bains

 Nogent-sur-Marne, France
 Winterthur, Switzerland

Z
Zermatt

 Alfano, Italy
 Castro Daire, Portugal
 Fujikawaguchiko, Japan
 Lijiang, China
 Myōkō, Japan
 Sexten, Italy

Zollikofen
 Neudörfl, Austria

Zug

 Fürstenfeld, Austria
 Vișeu de Sus, Romania

Zürich

 Kunming, China
 San Francisco, United States

Zweisimmen
 Oberrot, Germany

References

Switzerland
Lists of populated places in Switzerland
Foreign relations of Switzerland